Me Wage Adarayak (A Love Like This) (මේ වගේ ආදරයක්) is a 2015 Sri Lankan Sinhala romantic film directed and produced by Chandran Rutnam for Taprobane Films. It stars Dinakshie Priyasad and Anuj Ranasinghe in lead roles along with Heshan Don and Kuma Aththanayake. Music composed by Chitral Somapala. The movie has elements that closely mirror Hollywood movie Love Story(1970) which is in turn based on the book by Erich Segal of the same name. It is the 1231st Sri Lankan film in the Sinhala cinema.

Plot
25 year-old Roshan is an instructor in a leading aviation company. He comes from a high class family and his father is an influential politician. Roshan falls in love with Serina who is an engineering student in same company. They face many obstacles because of Roshan's father. Roshan decides to disregard everything and venture into a new life with Serina. Fate intervenes in the life of these two lovers..

Cast
 Anuj Ranasinghe as Roshan
 Dinakshie Priyasad as Serina
 Heshan Don
 Kuma Aththanayake as Serina's father
 Nalaka Vishwamith
 Wilman Sirimanne as Roshan's father
 Nalaka Daluwatta
 Richard Weerakkody
 Miyasi Sandeepani as Serina's friend

Soundtrack

References

External links
මේ වගේ ආදරයක් තිරයට පැමිණි දා

2015 films
2010s Sinhala-language films